Micheal Altman, also known as Micheal J Altman, is a scholar of American religious history and Asian religions in American culture at The University of Alabama. His research focuses on the development of the representation of Hinduism in the United States.

Bibliography  
 Hinduism in America: An Introduction (London: Routledge), 2022.
 Heathen, Hindoo, Hindu: Representations of India in America, 1721-1893, (New York: Oxford University Press), 2017.
 American Examples: New Conversations about Religion, Volume 1, ed. (Tuscaloosa, AL: University of Alabama Press) 2021.
 American Examples: New Conversations about Religion, Volume 2, ed. with Samah Choudhury and Prea Persaud (University of Alabama Press). Forthcoming December 6, 2022

See also 
 Hinduphobia
 David Frawley

References 

Living people
University of Alabama faculty
American historians of religion
Year of birth missing (living people)